This is a list of destinations that Syphax Airlines flew to (as of 2015).

References

Lists of airline destinations